The qualification preliminary round matches were played from 12 April to 29 June 2006. Winners of the preliminary round were advanced to the group stage.

Matches

|}

First leg

Match originally ended as a 2–1 victory for Republic of Ireland, but UEFA later awarded the match as a 3–0 forfeit win to the same team due to Azerbaijan including ineligible players in their squad.

Match originally ended as a 2–1 victory for Armenia, but UEFA later awarded the match as a 3–0 forfeit win to San Marino due to Armenia including ineligible players in their squad.

Second leg

Georgia won 4–2 on aggregate

Macedonia won 5–0 on aggregate

Northern Ireland won 8–1 on aggregate

Republic of Ireland won 6–0 on aggregate

Wales won 7–1 on aggregate

Iceland won 2–0 on aggregate

Armenia won 4–3 on aggregate

Moldova won 1–0 on aggregate

External links
 Preliminary round results at UEFA.com

Qual preliminary round
Prel